Shanxi cuisine, or Jin cuisine, is derived from the native cooking styles of Shanxi Province in China. It is famous for noodles, fried flatbread (da bing) and sour tastes. The cuisine is also famed for using its locally produced vinegar, just like in Huaiyang cuisine, but the flavour is totally different.

Generally speaking, Shanxi cuisine is not well known to people outside the region. This is partially because Shanxi is less populated than other provinces in China. Being a very traditional region where the lifestyle of locals has not been disturbed, many outsiders find Shanxi cuisine too authentic and traditional.

While pork and chicken are common in Shanxi, one of the most popular meat sources is lamb. Goat, and sheep offal is also often used. For example, lamb soup is usually cooked with livers, stomach and other offal.  As a traditional area with strong cultural connections to  Northwest Asian nomadic nations and minorities, the use of lamb in Shanxi cuisine  presents a unique fusion of the culinary traditions of Northern Chinese minorities and Han Chinese. For example, using ground lamb and carrots as a dumpling filling, is something that is not found in any other Chinese cooking styles. Ground pork with chopped dill is another popular dumpling filling.

The main staples reflect the crops commonly grown in Shanxi: millet, sorghum, and wheat. Pork, mushrooms, potatoes and turnips are frequently used in dishes.

Styles
Shanxi cuisine comprises three styles:

 Northern Shanxi style: Represented by dishes from Datong and Mount Wutai, with emphasis on colour and oil. More oil and seasoning are important.
 Southern Shanxi style: Represented by dishes from Linfen and the Grand Canal regions, specialising in seafood, despite the fact that Shanxi is a landlocked province, the taste is light.
 Central Shanxi style: Represented by dishes from Taiyuan, which presents a mainstream cooking style compared to both the northern and southern regions of the province. It is the combination of southern and northern flavors, with fine selection of ingredients and a salty taste. Before the 1970s, as local cuisine and professional cooking had not been influenced by Cantonese and Sichuan styles, Taiyuan cuisine contained a number of noodle dishes, Chinese Muslim dishes, local hot pot dishes, and meat dishes using fresh water seafood and lamb. The region is especially famous for its knife-shaven noodles (dao xiao mian).

Shanxi Noodles

 Braised String Bean with Noodles（焖面; Menmian）

The area north of Jinzhong, including the area to the north, is called stewed noodles. By stewing the noodles and stir-frying them with the vegetables you want to eat.

 Shanxi Chow Mien（炒面/炒揪片）

Pull the noodles out piece by piece and boil them in a pot. Soy sauce, vinegar, sesame oil, salt, and some chopped green onions can put in the pot. Then stir-fry them with vegetables.

Shanxi Knife-Cut Noodles（山西刀削面）

Traditionally, the noodles are held in one hand while the knife is held in the other hand and peeled directly until the water boils. The noodles are cooked in one piece. Shanxi knife cutting noodles have a variety of ways to eat. There are tomato sauce, meat fried sauce, lamb soup, and many other toppings.

 Shanxi Cats' ear（山西猫耳朵）

Put the dough on the panel and press it forward with your fingers to form a small cat's ear, then pour the sauce on it after cooking, or stir-fry it with vegetable after cooking.

 Shanxi Kao Lao Lao（山西栲栳栳）

This traditional noodle dish is famous in the alpine region of Shanxi, and is called "laolao" because it is shaped like a "fence bucket". It is made with oat noodles and there is a meat topping.

 Shanxi Oil Cake（山西油糕）

Shanxi oil cake, also known as fried cake, rice cake,  is one of the most representative local flavor snacks in the area of Jin, Shaanxi, Gansu and Ningxia.

 Shanxi Shumai（百花稍梅）
The name is taken from the top of the fluffy art of folding like the shape of the flower.

The shumai is made on the steamer, similar to the small dumplings, but the shape is more beautiful than the small dumplings. The taste is also more characteristic than the small dumplings.

 Shanxi Steamed bread Mantou（山西馒头）

In Shanxi, people call steamed bread is Mo.There are many colorful patterns and designs of Mo. Therefore, many people also call Mo is Huamo because Hua represents colorful flowers.

Shanxi mature vinegar 
Shanxi mature vinegar, also called Shanxi lao chencu in Chinese, is a special type of vinegar produced in Shanxi Province. Based on the techniques used to prepare the vinegar, it should be more accurately called "aged Shanxi vinegar" or "extra aged vinegar".

Shanxi old vinegar is one of the four famous vinegars in China, which has a history of more than 3,000 years and has the reputation of "the best vinegar in the world". The longer the vinegar is stored, the more fragrant and tasty it is. It's called Old Chen vinegar because it was born thousands of years ago and has been inherited until today while maintaining the basic technology and with the continuous improvement of brewing technology. Shanxi old vinegar can be kept for 9–12 months in general, and some better vinegars can be kept for at least 3–10 years. Some of the methods used in brewing the vinegar have been considered intellectual properties and are under the protection of Chinese laws.

It is a famous product of the region, and is produced primarily in Qingxu County, a vicinity of the provincial capital of Taiyuan. The Shanxi Vinegar Culture Museum has been built there. Local Taiyuan residents, especially those who have lived there for generations, prefer Donghu Mature Vinegar produced by Shanxi Mature Vinegar Group, which is the largest mature vinegar manufacturer in China. There is also Ninghuafu Yiyuanqing, a brand of vinegar produced by the Yiyuanqing Company in the old downtown area of Taiyuan.

In the United States, some Asian grocery stores sell Shanxi mature vinegar. The common suppliers are Shanxi Mature Vinegar Group, a China Time-Honored Brand company since 1368, and Shuita Brand, a brewing company located in Qingxu County.

Notable dishes

References

Regional cuisines of China
Culture in Shanxi